Lena Lake is located in Glacier National Park, in the U. S. state of Montana. Richard T. Evans, USGS topographer who worked on the early map of Glacier Park, is reported to have named this lake for his wife, Macy Lena Leins.

See also
List of lakes in Glacier County, Montana

References

External links
 Lena Lake photo: Flickr
 Lena Lake photo: Flickr

Lakes of Glacier National Park (U.S.)
Lakes of Glacier County, Montana